This is the list of European junior records in Olympic weightlifting. European junior records are the best marks set in competition by athletes aged 20 or younger throughout the entire calendar year of the performance. Records are maintained in each weight class for the snatch lift, Clean and jerk lift, and the total for both lifts by the European Weightlifting Federation (EWF).

Current records
Key to tables:

Men

Women

Historical records

Men (1998–2018)

Women (1998–2018)

References
General
 European Records – Junior Men 16 August 2022 updated
 European Records – Junior Women 24 September 2021 updated
Specific

External links
 EWF official website
 EWF records page

Junior records in Olympic weightlifting
Europe, junior
Weightlifting junior